Ning Jing (born April 27, 1972) is a Chinese actress and singer. She is best known for playing Milan in In the Heat of the Sun (1994), Danzhu in Red River Valley (1997), Angel in Lover's Grief over the Yellow River (1999) and Empress Dowager Xiaozhuang in the television series Xiaozhuang Epic (2003). Ning has received various accolades, including a Silver Shell for Best Actress, a Golden Rooster Award from two nominations, two Hundred Flowers Awards, and has been nominated for one Golden Horse Award.

Early life 
Ning Jing was born in Guiyang, Guizhou. Her mother is Nakhi, and her father is Han. She has a younger brother, Shun Wenqi, who is a rock musician.

Personal life 
In 1996, while shooting Red River Valley, Ning fell in love with Paul Kersey, an American actor also performing a role in this film. Then they married each other and had a child.  In 2011, Ning stated that due to cultural differences, they divorced.

Filmography

Film

Television

Reality show

Awards and nominations

References

External links
 
 
Chinese Beauties

Living people
1972 births
Actresses from Guizhou
People from Guiyang
Chinese film actresses
Chinese television actresses
Chinese stage actresses
Chinese voice actresses
Shanghai Theatre Academy alumni
Participants in Chinese reality television series
20th-century Chinese actresses
21st-century Chinese actresses